"Dream Dancing" is a song written by Cole Porter for the 1941 film You'll Never Get Rich, where it was introduced as an instrumental. The first recording was made by Fred Astaire (who also starred in the film) with Harry Sosnik and his Orchestra and The Delta Rhythm Boys in 1941 under the Decca label (#18188).

Notable recordings

Vocal
Tony Pastor and His Orchestra - So Near And Yet So Far (1941)
Tony Bennett - included in the album The Complete Tony Bennett/Bill Evans Recordings (2009)
Ella Fitzgerald – Dream Dancing (1978)
Mel Tormé, George Shearing – An Evening at Charlie's (1983)
Zoot Sims with Jimmy Rowles – Warm Tenor (1990)
Stacey Kent - for her album Close Your Eyes (1997)
Tony Bennett and Lady Gaga - for their collaborative album Love for Sale (2021)

Instrumental
Dave McKenna – Live at Maybeck Recital Hall, Vol. 2 (1990)
Spike Robinson – Reminiscin''' (1992)
Beegie Adair - Dream Dancing: Songs of Cole Porter'' (2001)

References

Songs written by Cole Porter
1941 songs
Fred Astaire songs